Khammam railway station (station code:KMT) is a railway station located in Khammam district of Telangana, India. The station is served by Indian Railways and is well connected by rail to all parts of India. 98 trains arrive at or depart from the station every day, transporting over one lakh sixty thousand (160,000) passengers daily to their destinations across the country. Khammam railway station was declared second cleanest in the 'A' category stations. Khammam railway station is the one of the biggest and busiest railway stations in the south central railway system. The station has two platforms serving five tracks, one of which serves goods only. Khammam railway station is part of the Visakhapatnam - Secunderabad Vande Bharat Express connecting Hyderabad to Visakhapatnam in 8 hours and 30 minutes

References

External links 

Railway stations in Khammam district
Secunderabad railway division